James Valley Christian School is a private non-denominational Christian school in Huron, South Dakota. The school is a member of the Association of Christian Schools International.

History
James Valley Christian School first opened their doors in the fall of 1956 outside of Huron, South Dakota by individuals who desired Christian education in their area. The school campus was built in the James River Valley on the same campus as Byron Bible Camp. In 1972, the original building burned down and a new building was built on the same campus. For the next few years, school was held in the Huron Middle School building, prior to its demolition. The school moved into the current building in August 2000. In early 2018, JVCS, broke ground on an auditorium and an auxiliary gym.

Academics

Extracurricular 
James Valley Christian School is a member of the South Dakota High School Activities Association. It has a concert band, a pep band, and a choir program. The Oral Interpretation Team and One-Act play has had many years of success. Sports include soccer, volleyball, cross country, basketball, cheerleading, track and golf.

Notable alumni
Ron Tschetter, Peace Corps director Sept 2006–2008; Class of 1959, the first graduating class
 Sally Lott, Missionary in Africa; class of 1973

References

"Through Fire & Flood", the school's 50th anniversary book.

External links

 
  JVC's Facebook page

Private high schools in South Dakota
Educational institutions established in 1957
Private middle schools in South Dakota
Private elementary schools in South Dakota
Buildings and structures in Huron, South Dakota
Schools in Beadle County, South Dakota
1957 establishments in South Dakota